Raymond Vergès (15 August 1882 in Saint-Denis, Réunion – 2 July 1957) was a French politician. He represented the French Communist Party in the Constituent Assembly elected in 1945 and in the National Assembly from 1946 to 1955.

References

1882 births
1957 deaths
People from Saint-Denis, Réunion
Politicians of Réunion
French Communist Party politicians
Members of the Constituent Assembly of France (1945)
Deputies of the 1st National Assembly of the French Fourth Republic
Deputies of the 2nd National Assembly of the French Fourth Republic